The following lists events that happened during 2013 in Cambodia.

Incumbents 
 Monarch: Norodom Sihamoni 
 Prime Minister: Hun Sen

Events

February
 February 4 - The remains of former King Norodom Sihanouk of Cambodia who died on 15 October 2012 are cremated in Phnom Penh.

March
 March 30 - Nuon Chea, the most senior surviving Khmer Rouge leader, is declared fit for trial by a United Nations-backed court in Cambodia.

April
 April 15 - A hearing into the territorial row between Thailand and Cambodia begins at the International Court of Justice in The Hague, Netherlands.

May
 May 16 - A shoe factory collapses in Cambodia, killing three.

June
 June 7 - Cambodia passes a controversial law that makes it illegal to deny atrocities committed by the Khmer Rouge regime.

July
 July 28 - Voters in Cambodia go to the polls for a general election with the governing Cambodian People's Party led by Prime Minister Hun Sen claiming victory amidst opposition claims of widespread irregularities.

References

 
Years of the 21st century in Cambodia
Cambodia
2010s in Cambodia
Cambodia